Nordkinnhalvøya is a peninsula in Finnmark county, Norway. It is the northernmost part of mainland Europe. The peninsula is shared among the municipalities of Lebesby and Gamvik.  Human settlement is mostly concentrated on the northern shores and at the base of the peninsula, while the middle parts of the peninsula are sparsely inhabited. The main villages on the peninsula are Mehamn, Gamvik, and Kjøllefjord—all located on the northern shore. Slettnes Lighthouse near Gamvik is the northernmost lighthouse on mainland Europe.

The world's northernmost labyrinth is located on the peninsula; the labyrinths in Finnmark were created in the period 1200–1500.

Geography

The highest point on Nordkinnhalvøya is Storvarden in the Sandfjellet massif. The northernmost point on the peninsula is the Kinnarodden cliff, which is also the northernmost point of mainland Norway and Europe.

The peninsula is situated between the Tanafjorden to the east and the Laksefjorden to the west. They both empty into the Barents Sea.

Transportation
Norwegian County Road 888 connects the villages of Gamvik, Mehamn, and Lebesby to the European route E6 highway at the base of the peninsula, and from there it continues on to the towns of Kirkenes in the east and Alta in the west. The Hurtigruten coastal ship stops in Mehamn and Kjøllefjord, both on this peninsula.  Mehamn Airport, with services by Widerøe, is the airport that serves the peninsula and surrounding area.

Commerce
Fishing permits are sold for use on specific rivers, including Risfjordelva (Sami: Rassavuoles-jokha).

References

Peninsulas of Troms og Finnmark
Lebesby
Gamvik
Tana, Norway